Neulpur is a village near Chandikhole in Jajpur district, Odisha, India.

References

Villages in Jajpur district